Filip Bakoč (born May 2, 1996) is a Macedonian professional basketball power forward for KK Rabotnički in the Macedonian First League. He is also member of Macedonia national basketball team

References

External links
 Eurobasket profile
 Fiba profile

1996 births
Sportspeople from Skopje
Macedonian men's basketball players
Living people
Macedonian people of Serbian descent
Power forwards (basketball)